Patrick Schneeweis, known better by his stage name Pat the Bunny, is a retired American musician, singer-songwriter and producer. He has been the front man of notable folk punk and anarcho-punk groups Johnny Hobo and the Freight Trains, Wingnut Dishwashers Union, and Ramshackle Glory. Originally based out of Brattleboro, Vermont, he lived in Tucson, Arizona during the final part of his musical career. His writing often describes topics such as life under capitalism, drug addiction, and the importance of pursuing radical ways of relating socially and economically usually through anarchism and DIY ethic.

Biography 
Schneeweis was born in Brattleboro, Vermont. He has been playing music with his younger brother, Michael, for a long time. He attended The Putney School for a short period of time. His father Charlie Schneeweis plays the trumpet.

In 2009 Pat checked himself into rehab for heroin and alcohol addiction. He stated on his website that he was not sure if he would continue with music after rehab. Once out of rehab, he moved to Tucson, Arizona and formed Ramshackle Glory. After rehab Pat released a slew of Ramshackle Glory records, solo acoustic records, and split albums with other DIY musicians. He toured both with Ramshackle Glory and independently for the next five years.

In February 2016 he announced that he was at least temporarily retiring from music, stating that the ideologies of punk rock and anarchism no longer matched his own. Ramshackle Glory played their final show at the final Plan-it-X Fest in June 2016. They released their final album One Last Big Job in December 2016. Patrick Schneeweis announced he will eventually be donating the proceeds of his solo work and band's releases through social media music platform Bandcamp to charitable organizations supporting music education.

In 2019, Pat was brought out by Ceschi to play "This City Is Killing Me" off of their split EP. It is unclear if Pat will continue playing shows in the future.

Johnny Hobo and the Freight Trains 

Pat's first major recording project was called "Running with Meat Cleavers," and was inspired by the contemporary Brattleboro punk scene including bands such as Vomit Dichotomy and Fancy Pants & the Cell Phones. Following this was a band who's name would regularly change, and was tongue-in-cheek, with the format of "Johnny ___ and the ___". For example, the band was called "Johnny Sexless and the Virgin Mafia" to reflect the themes of the song "DIY Orgasms." Eventually the name "Johnny Hobo" stuck, despite the vocal annoyance of Pat himself at this name. The first demo was primarily solo, being just acoustic guitar played atop of programmed drums. The group quickly expanded and became entirely acoustic. Johnny Hobo toured extensively during their career; often, Pat would be the only touring member. Alcohol, drug use, homelessness, politics, suicide, and the punk scene were common themes in Johnny Hobo songs. Song for a Harmony Parking Lot may be in reference to a parking lot in Schneeweis's hometown of Brattleboro where Schneeweis once did a nude sit-in protest and was quoted as saying "It's too hot to wear clothes". They released four EPs, two splits, a live album, and two compilations before disbanding.

Demos/EPs

Split Albums

Live

Compilation

sadjoy 

sadjoy (stylized in all lowercase) is a solo recording project of Pat's younger brother, Michael, which began when he was 15 or 16. It was previously known as Michael Jordan Touchdown Pass. Pat played bass and back-up vocals during live shows. Michael has played with Ramshackle Glory live on at least one occasion.

Wingnut Dishwashers Union 

With the ending of Johnny Hobo, Pat continued writing songs and formed Wingnut Dishwashers Union. Similar to Johnny Hobo, Wingnut Dishwashers Union toured constantly, often just with Pat. In contrast to Johnny Hobo, many songs used electric rather than acoustic guitar. They released three full-length albums, two splits, and a compilation during their two-year career, in addition to a solo rendition of their debut album by Pat. Their song topics diverged slightly from Johnny Hobo and the Freight Trains with a more hopeful view of the future. Wingnut Dishwashers Union broke up when Pat entered rehab at the end of 2009.

Full-length album

Split Albums

Live

Compilation

Playtime Posse 

"The Green Mountain State's second-best rap crew, shattering all preconceptions and slanderous chatter, a hot buttery corn muffin of rhyme". A humorous hip-hop side-project formed by Pat and several friends.

Full-length album

Solo 

Shortly after leaving rehab, Pat moved to Tucson, Arizona and began writing new material about political agitation and his battles with drug addiction. Most of these songs were used with the band Ramshackle Glory. However, during Ramshackle Glory's hiatus, Pat began focusing on a solo path. In 2012 he started releasing new solo music. From the beginning of 2014 till his retirement Pat was touring frequently as a solo act. After his South Eastern United States tour in October 2015, Pat announced that he would be taking a long break from shows and touring though he would be releasing a final album with Ramshackle Glory. 

In February 2016, Pat announced that he would be ending his music career altogether, stating a change in identity in contrast to his former persona as "Pat the Bunny".

Full-length album

Split album

Demos/EPs

Live

Compilation

Ramshackle Glory 

After graduating from rehab, Pat moved to Tucson, Arizona, began writing new music about the politics of drug addiction, and formed the full electric band Ramshackle Glory. They released two full-length albums and toured the country twice and then took a hiatus from 2012 to 2013. The group got back together and released a split album with Ghost Mice in 2013 and went on another cross-country tour. They broke up in 2016 following a farewell show at Plan-It-X Fest in Spencer, Indiana and the release of their third and final album.

Full-length album

Split album

One Man Romance 

One Man Romance is a pop band originally from Tucson, AZ and the lead songwriter Wyndham Maxwell now resides in Worcester, MA.

Full-length album

Big Swamp Gospel 

Big Swamp Gospel is a fictional narrative album about god and the devil, set in a spooky small town.

Full-length album

Personal life
As of 2011, Schneeweis is sober and off drugs describing it as his "life for a very long time" and "defined my life".

Timeline

References

External links
Bandcamp

1987 births
21st-century American singers
21st-century American guitarists
21st-century American male singers
American male singer-songwriters
American singer-songwriters
American rock guitarists
American male guitarists
American rock singers
American rock songwriters
Living people
Folk punk musicians
Anarcho-punk musicians
American anarchists